Moldovan clubs have participated since 2001, when Codru entered the 2001–02 UEFA Women's Cup.

UEFA Women's Cup/UEFA Women's Champions League

Matches
{| class="wikitable" style="font-size:86%; text-align: center;"
! width="80"|Season
! width="150"|Club
! width="150|Round
! width="150"|Opponent
! width="53|Home
! width="53|Away
! width="80|Agg.
!
|-
| colspan="8" style="text-align:center;"| UEFA Women's Cup
|-
| rowspan=4| 2001–02
| rowspan=4| Codru Chișinău
| Qualifying round
| align="left" | Ilirija Ljubljana
| bgcolor="#ddffdd"|9–0
| bgcolor="#ddffdd"|9–0
| 18–0
| 
|-
| rowspan=3| Group 4 (host)
| align="left" | College Yerevan
|bgcolor=ddffdd colspan=2|9–0
| rowspan=3| 3rd
| rowspan=3| 
|-
| align="left" | Frankfurt
|bgcolor=ffdddd colspan=2|0–5
|-
| align="left" | Levante
|bgcolor=ffdddd colspan=2|1–3
|-bgcolor=#EEEEEE
| rowspan=3| 2002–03
| rowspan=3| Codru Anenii Noi
| rowspan=3| Group 6 (host)
| align="left" | Fortuna Hjørring
|bgcolor=ffdddd colspan=2|0–5
| rowspan=3| 4th
| rowspan=3| 
|-bgcolor=#EEEEEE
| align="left" | Bobruichanka
|bgcolor=ffdddd colspan=2|0–6
|-bgcolor=#EEEEEE
| align="left" | Breiðablik
|bgcolor=ffdddd colspan=2|0–2
|-
| rowspan=3| 2003–04
| rowspan=3| Codru Anenii Noi
| rowspan=3| Group 8 (host)
| align="left" | Ter Leede
|bgcolor=ffdddd colspan=2|0–8
| rowspan=3| 3rd
| rowspan=3| 
|-
| align="left" | Fulham London
|bgcolor=ffdddd colspan=2|1–9
|-
| align="left" | KÍ Klaksvík
|bgcolor=ddffdd colspan=2|5–3
|-bgcolor=#EEEEEE
| rowspan=3| 2004–05
| rowspan=3| Codru Anenii Noi
| rowspan=3| First qualifying roundGroup A3 (host)
| align="left" | Bobruichanka
|bgcolor=ffdddd colspan=2|0–2
| rowspan=3| 2nd
| rowspan=3| 
|-bgcolor=#EEEEEE
| align="left" | Viktória Szombathely
|bgcolor=ffffdd colspan=2|1–1
|-bgcolor=#EEEEEE
| align="left" | Pärnu
|bgcolor=ddffdd colspan=2|5–1
|-
| rowspan=3| 2005–06
| rowspan=3| Codru Anenii Noi
| rowspan=3| First qualifying roundGroup A5 (host)
| align="left" | Skiponjat
|bgcolor=ddffdd colspan=2|4–1
| rowspan=3| 2nd
| rowspan=3| 
|-
| align="left" | KÍ Klaksvík
|bgcolor=ddffdd colspan=2|4–1
|-
| align="left" | LUwin.ch
|bgcolor=ffdddd colspan=2|0–4
|-bgcolor=#EEEEEE
| rowspan=3| 2006–07
| rowspan=3| Narta Chișinău
| rowspan=3| First qualifying roundGroup A9 (host)
| align="left" | NSA Sofia
|bgcolor=ffdddd colspan=2|1–3
| rowspan=3| 3rd
| rowspan=3| 
|-bgcolor=#EEEEEE
| align="left" | Gömrükçü Baku
|bgcolor=ddffdd colspan=2|2–1
|-bgcolor=#EEEEEE
| align="left" | Femina Budapest
|bgcolor=ffdddd colspan=2|0–7
|-
| rowspan=3| 2007–08
| rowspan=3| Narta Chișinău
| rowspan=3| First qualifying roundGroup A9 (host)
| align="left" | Alma
|bgcolor=ffdddd colspan=2|0–5
| rowspan=3| 3rd
| rowspan=3| 
|-
| align="left" | Femina Budapest
|bgcolor=ffdddd colspan=2|0–2
|-
| align="left" | Ruslan-93
|bgcolor=ddffdd colspan=2|3–1
|-bgcolor=#EEEEEE
| rowspan=3| 2008–09
| rowspan=3| Narta Chișinău
| rowspan=3| First qualifying roundGroup A2 (host)
| align="left" | Mašinac Niš
|bgcolor=ffdddd colspan=2|1–15
| rowspan=3| 4th
| rowspan=3| 
|-bgcolor=#EEEEEE
| align="left" | AZ Alkmaar
|bgcolor=ffdddd colspan=2|0–7
|-bgcolor=#EEEEEE
| align="left" | Glasgow City
|bgcolor=ffdddd colspan=2|0–11
|-
| colspan="8" style="text-align:center;"| UEFA Women's Champions League
|-
| rowspan=3| 2009–10
| rowspan=3| Roma Calfa
| rowspan=3| Qualifying roundGroup 5 (host)
| align="left" | Linköping
|bgcolor=ffdddd colspan=2|0–11
| rowspan=3| 4th
| rowspan=3| 
|-
| align="left" | Clujana
|bgcolor=ffdddd colspan=2|0–9
|-
| align="left" | Glentoran Belfast
|bgcolor=ffdddd colspan=2|0–2
|-bgcolor=#EEEEEE
| rowspan=3| 2010–11
| rowspan=3| Roma Calfa
| rowspan=3| Qualifying roundGroup 1 (host)
| align="left" | Brøndby
|bgcolor=ffdddd colspan=2|0–6
| rowspan=3| 3rd
| rowspan=3| 
|-bgcolor=#EEEEEE
| align="left" | NSA Sofia
|bgcolor=ffdddd colspan=2|0–4
|-bgcolor=#EEEEEE
| align="left" | Gazi Üniversitesi
|bgcolor=ffffdd colspan=2|3–3
|-
| rowspan=3| 2011–12
| rowspan=3| Goliador Chișinău
| rowspan=3| Qualifying roundGroup 1 (host)
| align="left" | PAOK
|bgcolor=ffdddd colspan=2|0–3
| rowspan=3| 4th
| rowspan=3| 
|-
| align="left" | Young Boys Bern
|bgcolor=ffdddd colspan=2|0–7
|-
| align="left" | Naše Taksi
|bgcolor=ffdddd colspan=2|0–6
|-bgcolor=#EEEEEE
| rowspan=3| 2012–13
| rowspan=3| Noroc Nimoreni
| rowspan=3| Qualifying roundGroup 8 (host)
| align="left" | PK-35 Vantaa
|bgcolor=ffdddd colspan=2|0–6
| rowspan=3| 4th
| rowspan=3| 
|-bgcolor=#EEEEEE
| align="left" | Glasgow City
|bgcolor=ffdddd colspan=2|0–11
|-bgcolor=#EEEEEE
| align="left" | Osijek
|bgcolor=ffdddd colspan=2|1–11
|-
| rowspan=3| 2013–14
| rowspan=3| Goliador Chișinău
| rowspan=3| Qualifying roundGroup 7 (host)
| align="left" | ASA Tel Aviv
|bgcolor=ffdddd colspan=2|0–6
| rowspan=3| 4th
| rowspan=3| 
|-
| align="left" | Apollon Limassol
|bgcolor=ffdddd colspan=2|0–1
|-
| align="left" | Union Nové Zámky
|bgcolor=ffdddd colspan=2|0–6
|-bgcolor=#EEEEEE
| rowspan=3| 2014–15
| rowspan=3| Goliador-Real Chișinău
| rowspan=3| Qualifying roundGroup 5 (host)
| align="left" | Osijek
|bgcolor=ffdddd colspan=2|0–12
| rowspan=3| 4th
| rowspan=3| 
|-bgcolor=#EEEEEE
| align="left" | Spartak Subotica
|bgcolor=ffdddd colspan=2|0–19
|-bgcolor=#EEEEEE
| align="left" | Amazones Dramas
|bgcolor=ffdddd colspan=2|0–11
|-
| rowspan=3| 2015–16
| rowspan=3| Noroc Nimoreni
| rowspan=3| Qualifying roundGroup 6 (host)
| align="left" | Osijek
|bgcolor=ffdddd colspan=2|0–4
| rowspan=3| 4th
| rowspan=3| 
|-
| align="left" | Spartak Subotica
|bgcolor=ffdddd colspan=2|1–4
|-
| align="left" | Benfica
|bgcolor=ffdddd colspan=2|0–3
|-bgcolor=#EEEEEE
| rowspan=3| 2016–17
| rowspan=3| ARF Criuleni
| rowspan=3| Qualifying roundGroup 7 (host)
| align="left" | Gintra Universitetas
|bgcolor=ffdddd colspan=2|0–13
| rowspan=3| 4th
| rowspan=3| 
|-bgcolor=#EEEEEE
| align="left" | BIIK Kazygurt
|bgcolor=ffdddd colspan=2|0–3
|-bgcolor=#EEEEEE
| align="left" | Wexford
|bgcolor=ffffdd colspan=2|0–0
|-
| rowspan=3| 2017–18
| rowspan=3| Noroc Nimoreni
| rowspan=3| Qualifying roundGroup 5 (host)
| align="left" | Sturm Graz
|bgcolor=ffdddd colspan=2|0–4
| rowspan=3| 4th
| rowspan=3| 
|-
| align="left" | Apollon Limassol
|bgcolor=ffdddd colspan=2|0–6
|-
| align="left" | NSA Sofia
|bgcolor=ffdddd colspan=2|0–1
|-bgcolor=#EEEEEE
| rowspan=3| 2018–19
| rowspan=3| Agarista Anenii Noi
| rowspan=3| Qualifying roundGroup 8 (host)
| align="left" | Pärnu
|bgcolor=ffdddd colspan=2|0–2
| rowspan=3| 4th
| rowspan=3| 
|-bgcolor=#EEEEEE
| align="left" | Sarajevo
|bgcolor=ffdddd colspan=2|0–5
|-bgcolor=#EEEEEE
| align="left" | Vllaznia Shkodër
|bgcolor=ffdddd colspan=2|1–4
|-
| rowspan=3| 2019–20
| rowspan=3| Agarista Anenii Noi
| rowspan=3| Qualifying roundGroup 5 (host)
| align="left" | Spartak Subotica
|bgcolor=ffdddd colspan=2|0–12
| rowspan=3| 4th
| rowspan=3| 
|-
| align="left" | Ferencváros
|bgcolor=ffdddd colspan=2|0–2
|-
| align="left" | Slovan Bratislava
|bgcolor=ffdddd colspan=2|0–1
|-bgcolor=#EEEEEE
| 2020–21
| Agarista Anenii Noi
| First qualifying round
| align="left" | Spartak Subotica
| 
| bgcolor="#ffdddd"|0–4
| 
| 
|-
| rowspan=2| 2021–22
| rowspan=2| Agarista Anenii Noi
| rowspan=2| Round 1 (host)
| align="left" | PAOK
|bgcolor=ffdddd colspan=2|0–6
| rowspan=2| 4th
| rowspan=2| 
|-
| align="left" | Mitrovica
|bgcolor=ffdddd colspan=2|0–3
|-bgcolor=#EEEEEE
| rowspan=2| 2022–23
| rowspan=2| Agarista Anenii Noi
| rowspan=2| Round 1 (host)
| align="left" | Twente
|bgcolor=ffdddd colspan=2|0–13
| rowspan=2| 4th
| rowspan=2| 
|-bgcolor=#EEEEEE
| align="left" | EP-Hajvalia
|bgcolor=ffdddd colspan=2|0–7
|}

Overall record
As of 21 August 2022

By competition

By country

See also
Moldovan football clubs in European competitions

References

External links
UEFA Website

Women's football clubs in international competitions